Hero is a 1984 Indian Telugu-language film directed by Vijaya Bapineedu and produced by Allu Aravind. This film starred Chiranjeevi, Radhika, and Rao Gopal Rao in important roles. The film drew inspiration from the 1981 Hollywood film Raiders of The Lost Ark with the opening scene being an exact replica of the latter.

Plot 
Chiranjeevi plays an archeologist Krishna, who comes to a village in search of a plan for the hidden treasure. His friend Vikram was killed in the same village trying for that plan. One day during his work, he saves Kanakaraju and three other villagers from dying. They become his friend and also treat him as their philosopher and guide. Meanwhile, Radhika, a village belle, falls for him and forces him to marry her. When Krisha refuses, she successfully enters the role of a rape victim in front of the villagers. Krishna later learns that Kanakraju was in fact Kondababu, who killed Vikram, who was searching a plan for the hidden treasure. How Krishna plans and exposes Kanakaraju's reality forms the rest of the story.

Cast 
 Chiranjeevi as Krishna, an archeologist
 Raadhika
 Rao Gopal Rao
 Kaikala Satyanarayana
 Allu Ramalingaiah
 Nirmalamma
 Prasad Babu
 Jyothi Lakshmi as an item number
 Jayamalini as an item number
 Silk Smitha as an item number

Soundtrack 

 "Yettetta" - S. Janaki, S. P. Balasubrahmanyam
 "Ramalkashmanulu" - S. P. Balasubrahmanyam, P. Susheela
 "Kasi Looputtanu" - P. Susheela, S. P. Balasubrahmanyam
 "Devathalara" - S. Janaki, S. P. Balasubrahmanyam
 "Monnarathri" - S. Janaki
 "Ramalkashmanulu" 1 - S. P. Balasubrahmanyam, P. Susheela

References

External links 

1984 films

Geetha Arts films
1980s Telugu-language films